Sehna is a town and union council of Gujrat District, in the Punjab province of Pakistan. It is part of Kharian Tehsil.

References

Union councils of Gujrat District
Populated places in Gujrat District